Şehsuvar Şekerpare Hatun ("courage of the Şah" and "sugar lump"), previously known as Şehsuvar Usta, was a lady-in-waiting to Sultan Ibrahim of the Ottoman Empire.

Career
She began her career in Sultan Ibrahim's harem as the Hazinedar Usta (treasurer) of the imperial harem. She was later appointed Kethüde Hatun (mistress housekeeper). At the start, she was a high ranked lady-in-waiting of Kösem Sultan, the mother of Ibrahim.  

In 1644 the Grand vizier Kemankeş Mustafa Pasha's standing was threatened by a powerful faction which was controlling the appointment and dismissal of certain individuals, even enriching its members in the process. This party included Şekerpare as well as Ibrahim's other male favourites. Mustafa Pasha was executed and Ibrahim appointed his favourite Sultanzade Mehmed Pasha as the new Grand Vizier.

Şekerpare had great influence in the harem and attained wealth, apparently through bribery. A dispute arose between her and Kösem Sultan due of this bribery, and finally Şekerpare was exiled to the island of Chios or to Egypt in May 1648.

Personal life
In 1647, Şekerpare married Grand vizier Kara Musa Pasha. She played an important role in his career. He advanced in his career through his connection to Şekerpare; he first became agha of janissaries with the vizierate, and then held the post of intendant of finances. 

The treasure of Egypt was lavished on Ibrahims favourite wives and women, which also included Şekerpare. A house was also bought for her. She also owned sixteen chests of jewelry.

It was known that Ebezade Hamide Hatun, wife of Hasan Pasha, the governor of Aleppo, was a friend of Şekerpare Hatun.

Sponsorings

In early 1648 she endowed a fountain in Istanbul, and commissioned the building of her own mausoleum at Eyüp, which, however, remained empty.

References

Sources

External links
 

17th-century women from the Ottoman Empire
Ladies-in-waiting of the Ottoman Empire
Slaves from the Ottoman Empire
House slaves
Royal favourites
17th-century slaves